The 2014 Men's Hockey Düsseldorf Masters was the nineteenth edition of the Hamburg Masters, consisting of a series of test matches. It was held in Düsseldorf, Germany, from May 15 to 18, 2014, and featured four of the top nations in men's field hockey.

Competition format
The tournament featured the national teams of Belgium, England, the Netherlands, and the hosts, Germany, competing in a round-robin format, with each team playing each other once. Three points were awarded for a win, one for a draw, and none for a loss.

Results

Matches

Statistics

Goalscorers

References

2014
Men
2014 in German sport
2014 in Belgian sport
2014 in English sport
2014 in Dutch sport
Sport in Düsseldorf
May 2014 sports events in Germany